Clinidium sulcigaster is a species of ground beetle in the subfamily Rhysodinae. It was described by Ross T. Bell in 1970. It is known from near Lake Atitlán in Guatemala.

References

Clinidium
Beetles of Central America
Endemic fauna of Guatemala
Beetles described in 1970